Mullutu-Suurlaht (also Mullutu Suurlaht) is the fourth largest lake in Estonia. Mullutu-Suurlaht is a brackish waterbody that consists of two parts:
Suurlaht or Kellamäe Bay (eastern part)
Mullutu Bay or Great Mullutu Bay (western part)

Mullutu-Suurlaht is drained by the  Nasva River. Due to a strong connection with sea through Nasva river the lake is rich in fish, main species include bleak, burbot, crucian carp, dace, eel, gudgeon, ide, perch, pike, ruffe, roach, rudd and tench.

References

Lakes of Estonia
Saaremaa Parish
Landforms of Saare County